The Woman's Club of Tallahassee is a historic woman's club in Tallahassee, Florida. It is located at 1513 Cristobal Drive. On November 18, 1987, it was added to the U.S. National Register of Historic Places.

See also
List of Registered Historic Woman's Clubhouses in Florida

References

 Leon County listings at National Register of Historic Places
 Woman's Club of Tallahassee at Florida's Office of Cultural and Historical Programs
 Woman's Club of Tallahassee web-site

External links

 Woman's Club of Tallahassee - official site

Buildings and structures in Tallahassee, Florida
Culture of Tallahassee, Florida
History of Tallahassee, Florida
National Register of Historic Places in Tallahassee, Florida
Women's clubs in Florida
Women's club buildings in Florida
1927 establishments in Florida